Events in Italy in 1285:

Events 
September 4 - Battle of Les Formiguestook place probably in the early morning of 4 September 1285 near Les Formigues Islands, about 85 km northeast of Barcelona, when a Catalan-Sicilian galley fleet commanded by Roger of Lauria defeated a French and Genoese galley fleet commanded by Guilhem de Lodeva, Henry di Mari, and John de Orrea.
Rucellai Madonna painted for the Church of Santa Maria Novella in Florence
Jacopo Savelli becomes Pope Honorius IV upon election, succeeding Pope Martin IV

Births

Deaths

Charles I of Naples (1226–1285) - King of Sicily, Albania, and Naples; also known as Charles of Anjou
Pope Martin IV (Simon de Brion, ?-1285)
Philip I, Count of Savoy (1207–1285)
Amadeus V, Count of Savoy (ca. 1250-1285) - Amadeus the Great, successor to his uncle Philip I

References

Italy
Italy
Years of the 13th century in Italy